Suffering risks, known as s-risks for short, are future events with the potential capacity to produce an astronomical amount of suffering. These events may generate more suffering than has ever existed on Earth, in the entirety of its existence. Sources of possible s-risks include embodied artificial intelligence and superintelligence, as well as space colonization, which could potentially lead to "constant and catastrophic wars" and an immense increase in wild animal suffering by introducing wild animals, who "generally lead short, miserable lives full of sometimes the most brutal suffering", to other planets, either intentionally, or inadvertently. 

Steven Umbrello, an AI ethics researcher has warned that biological computing may make system design more prone to s-risks.

References

Further reading

See also 
 AI control problem
 Ethics of artificial intelligence
 Ethics of terraforming
 Existential risk from artificial general intelligence
 Global catastrophic risk
 Suffering-focused ethics
Wild animal suffering

Future problems
Philosophy of artificial intelligence
Risk
Space colonization
Suffering
Technology hazards
Terraforming